Sussex Street may refer to:
 Sussex Street, Cambridge, England
 Sussex Street, Sydney, Australia
 Sussex Drive, Ottawa, Canada, called Sussex Street before 1967